Two ships of the Royal Navy have borne the name HMS Zetland:

  was a  launched in 1917 and sold in 1923. 
  was a  launched in 1942, transferred to Norway in 1954 and renamed Tromso. She was sold in 1965 for breaking up.

Royal Navy ship names